1590 Tsiolkovskaja, provisional designation , is a stony Flora asteroid from the inner regions of the asteroid belt, approximately 11 kilometers in diameter. It was discovered on 1 July 1933, by Soviet–Russian astronomer Grigory Neujmin at Simeiz Observatory, on the Crimean peninsula. It was named for rocket scientist Konstantin Tsiolkovsky.

Classification and orbit 

Tsiolkovskaja is a member of the Flora family, a large group of stony S-type asteroids. It orbits the Sun in the inner main-belt at a distance of 1.9–2.6 AU once every 3 years and 4 months (1,217 days). Its orbit has an eccentricity of 0.16 and an inclination of 4° with respect to the ecliptic. Tsiolkovskaja was first observed at Heidelberg Observatory in 1907, extending the body's observation arc by 26 years prior to its discovery observation.

Physical characteristics 

Several rotational lightcurves were obtained from photometric observations. They gave a concurring, well-defined rotation period between 6.700 and 6.737 hours with a brightness variation of 0.10–0.40 in magnitude. Tsiolkovskaja has a relatively high albedo in the range of 0.21 to 0.42, according to the surveys carried out by IRAS, Akari, and WISE/NEOWISE, while the Collaborative Asteroid Lightcurve Link derives a moderate albedo of 0.23.

Naming 

This minor planet was named in honor of Soviet–Russian rocket scientist Konstantin Tsiolkovsky (1857–1935), considered to be one of the founding fathers of rocketry and astronautics and instrumental to the success of the Soviet space program. The official  was published by the Minor Planet Center on 31 January 1962. The lunar crater Tsiolkovskiy is also named after him.

References

External links 
 Lightcurve plot of 1590 Tsiolkovskaja, Palmer Divide Observatory, B. D. Warner (2007)
 Asteroid Lightcurve Database (LCDB), query form (info )
 Dictionary of Minor Planet Names, Google books
 Asteroids and comets rotation curves, CdR – Observatoire de Genève, Raoul Behrend
 Discovery Circumstances: Numbered Minor Planets (1)-(5000) – Minor Planet Center
 
 

001590
Discoveries by Grigory Neujmin
Named minor planets
19330701